A by-election was held for the Australian House of Representatives electorate of East Sydney in New South Wales on 4 September 1903, a Friday. It was triggered by the resignation of George Reid on 18 August 1903. The writ for the by-election was issued on 20 August, nominations for candidates closed on 27 August.

Background
At the time of his resignation, Reid was the leader of the Free Trade Party and the first Australian Opposition Leader. He resigned in protest on the day that a bill was passed in the parliament regarding the allocation of electoral boundaries for the state of New South Wales.

Results

Aftermath
Reid was returned as member for East Sydney with an increased majority. He was the first member of the House of Representatives to resign, and was the only person in federal parliamentary history to win back their own seat in a by-election after resigning until John Alexander did the same at the Bennelong by-election.

References

See also
List of Australian federal by-elections

1903 elections in Australia
New South Wales federal by-elections
1900s in Sydney